Ivela yini is a species of moth from the genus Ivela. It was originally described by Lin-Zhe Xie and  Hou-Shuai Wang in 2020

Description 

Ivela yini is a tussock moth that resembles Dendrophleps semihyalina. The specimens of this species are superficially similar to several tussock moths with which it is sympatric. I. yini specimens can be distinguished by superficial differences of which some are shown below where I. yini and Dendrophlebs semihyalina are compared, but can also be confirmed by dissecting the genetalia.

Range & habitat 
Both the holotype and paratypes were found in a forest between 1000‒1315 m in elevation in the Nanling National Nature Reserve in Guangdong, in South China.

Etymology 
Ivela yini is named after Ran Yin, who discovered the pupa. The name is in the genitive form.

References 

Noctuoidea
Insects described in 2022
Insects of China